Deirdre M. Curtin (born 17 January 1960) is a legal scholar who works in the area of law and governance of the European Union. Since 2015 she is Professor of European Law at the European University Institute of Florence.

Born in Dublin, Ireland, Curtin studied law at University College Dublin and Trinity College, Dublin. She was appointed to the faculty of the Europa Institute at Utrecht University. In 2003, she moved to the professorship of International and European Governance and the multidisciplinary Utrecht School of Governance. In 2008 she was appointed Professor of European Law at the University of Amsterdam, where in 2009 she founded the Amsterdam Centre for European Law and Governance ACELG. Additionally for many years she was visiting professor at the College of Europe in Bruges. Since 2003 Curtin is member of the Royal Netherlands Academy of Arts and Sciences. 
She was the first woman to be appointed a member of the academy in the section law. In 2007, she won the Spinozapremie, the first time it was awarded to a lawyer. In May 2021, she was made a member of the Royal Irish Academy.

Her specialist fields are European law and governance of the European Union. She studies phenomena such as democracy, legitimacy and accountability.

References

Selected publications

Books 

 Amtenbrink, D. Curtin, B. de Witte, P.J. Kuijper, A. McDonnell, S. van den Bogaert (eds.), Law of the European Union, Alphen aan den Rijn : Kluwer Law International, 2018.
 Fahey, E. and Curtin, D. (eds.), A Transatlantic Community of Law. Legal Perspectives on the Relationship between the EU and US Legal Orders, Cambridge: Cambridge University Press, 2014.
 Curtin, D., Mair, P. and Papadopoulos, I. (eds.), Accountability and European Governance, London: Routledge, 2012.
 Bovens, M., Curtin, D. and t'Hart, P. (eds.), The Real World of EU Accountability. What Deficit?, Oxford: Oxford University Press, 2010.
 Curtin, D., Executive Power in the European Union. Law, Practices and the Living Constitution, Oxford: Oxford University Press, 2009.

Articles 

 Curtin, D., "Second Order Secrecy and Europe’s Legality Mosaics", West European Politics, 2018, 41(4), pp. 846–868.
 Curtin, D. & Leino-Sandberg, P., "In Search of Transparency for EU Law-Making: Trilogues on the Cusp of Dawn", Common Market Law Review, 2017, 54(6), pp. 1673–1712.
 Curtin, D., "Accountable Independence of the European Central Bank: Seeing the Logics of Transparency", European Law Journal, 2017, 23(1-2), 28–44.
 Curtin, D., "Data Privacy Rights and Democracy: Ireland, Europe and Beyond", Irish Journal of European Law, 2015, 18(2), pp. 5 – 14.
 Curtin, D., "The Challenge of Executive Democracy in Europe", Modern Law Review, 2014, 77(1), pp. 1 – 32.
 Curtin, D., Hillebrandt, M., & Meijer, A., "Transparency in the EU Council of Ministers: An Institutional Analysis", European Law Journal, 2014, 20(1), pp. 1–20.

External links
 Home page
 Amsterdam Centre for European Law and Governance
 Utrecht School of Governance

Irish legal scholars
Members of the Royal Netherlands Academy of Arts and Sciences
Academic staff of the College of Europe
1960 births
Writers from Dublin (city)
Living people
Alumni of University College Dublin
Academic staff of Utrecht University
Alumni of Trinity College Dublin
Members of the Royal Irish Academy
Spinoza Prize winners
European Union law scholars